Thiago Soares (born 18 May 1981) is a Brazilian ballet dancer and choreographer.  He is a former principal dancer with The Royal Ballet in London, and guest principal in other theatres around the world.

Early life
Born in 1981 in Rio de Janeiro, Soares was introduced to dance in a street dance hip hop group of Vila Isabel in Rio de Janeiro eventually at 13 got a scholarship to trained to become a professional dancer at the Centre for Dance Rio where was graduated in 1998.

Career
Soares joined the Rio de Janeiro Municipal Theatre Ballet in 1998; where his repertoire included the Prince in The Nutcracker, Siegfried in Natalia Makarova's Swan Lake, Solor in Makarova's La Bayadère, Romeo in Vladimir Vasiliev's Romeo and Juliet, and Basilio in Don Quixote.  In 2002, he briefly trained with the Kirov Ballet and danced Siegfried and Basilio and Prince desire with the Russian State Ballet.

Soares joined the Royal Ballet in 2002 as a First Artist and was promoted to Soloist in September 2003, First Soloist in September 2004 and finally, Principal dancer  in September 2006 and eventually a principal guest from 2017 to 2019. His repertoire includes the majority of the classics the title role in John Cranko's production of Onegin, Siegfried in Anthony Dowell's Swan Lake, the Prince in Peter Wright's The Nutcracker, Solor in Makarova's La Bayadére, Prince Florimund in the Monica Mason, Count Albrecht in Sir Peter writer’s Giselle, Colas in sir Frederick Ashton’s La fille mal gardee, Franz in Nineteen de Valois Coopelia, Christopher Newton production of The Sleeping Beauty, the lead Pas de deux in William Forsyeth's In the Middle, Somewhat Elevated  Glen Tetley's Voluntaries, Mark Morris' Gong, Ivan Tsarevich in Fokine's The Firebird, the First Movement of Balanchine's Four Temperaments, the Second Movement of Balanchine's Symphony in C, Diamonds in Jewels, Balanchine's Tchaikovsky Pas de deux and the Queen of Fire's Consort in  Christopher Wheeldon's Fire variation in Homage to the Queen.
His Kenneth MacMillan repertoire includes Tybalt and Romeo in Romeo and Juliet, Rasputin in Anastasia, Lescaut in Manon, Elite Syncopations, Winter Dreams and Rudolf in Mayerling', Requien, (el Pepe) in Las hermanas

His Frederick Ashton repertoire includes the Thaïs Medatition as de deux, Orion in Sylvia, Colas in La fille mal gardée, Birthday Offering Pas de deux and Awakening Pas de deux, the Prince in Cinderella

He has also created roles in David Bintley's Les Saisons, Will Tucket's The Seven Deadly Sins, Liam Scarlett's Sweet Violets and Wayne McGregor's Raven Girl.

Awards
His awards include a silver medal at the Paris International Dance Competition in 1998, a gold medal at the Moscow International Ballet Competition at the Bolshoi Theatre in 2001, and the "Outstanding Classical Dancer" award at the UK 2004 Critic's Circle National Dance Awards 2018 Medal of Cavalier of the order of Rio Branco by the Brazilian government for his services in the Arts. In 2020, he received an honorary doctorate from King's College London.

Personal life
Soares married fellow dancer and frequent partner Marianela Núñez in Buenos Aires in July 2011. They separated in 2014 and announced their divorce in January 2016, but they remain dance partners and friends.

On DVD
In 2005, Soares performed Orion in a filmed performance of Sylvia, alongside Darcey Bussell as Sylvia and Roberto Bolle as Aminta. The performance was later released on DVD. In 2009, Soares  performed the lead male role Prince Sigfried in Sir Anthony Dowell’s Swan Lake with Royal ballet which is also available on DVD.

References

External links
 All I Am''. A Beadie Finzi's documentary 

Principal dancers of The Royal Ballet
1981 births
Living people
Brazilian male ballet dancers